Monica Marie Márquez (born April 20, 1969) is an associate justice of the Colorado Supreme Court. Previously a Deputy Colorado Attorney General, she was appointed by Governor Bill Ritter to the Supreme Court in 2010 to fill the vacancy created by the retirement of Chief Justice Mary Mullarkey. She was sworn in on December 10, 2010.

Biography
A native of Austin, Texas, Márquez grew up in Grand Junction, Colorado and graduated as valedictorian from Grand Junction High School in 1987. She earned a bachelor's degree from Stanford University in 1991 before spending two years with the Jesuit Volunteer Corps, working with at-risk children in Camden, New Jersey, and Philadelphia. She then attended Yale Law School, earning a Juris Doctor in 1997 and serving as an editor of the Yale Law Journal. She went on to clerk for two federal judges: Michael Ponsor of the District of Massachusetts and David M. Ebel of the Tenth Circuit. She then worked as an associate at Holme Roberts & Owen before joining the Colorado Attorney General's office in 2002.

Márquez is a past president of the Colorado LGBT Bar Association and a board member of the Colorado Hispanic Bar Association. She also served as chairwoman of the Denver Mayor’s GLBT Commission. Her father, Jose D.L. Márquez, was the first Latino judge of the Colorado Court of Appeals.

Judicial appointment
On August 24, 2010, the Colorado Supreme Court Nominating Commission selected Márquez as one of three candidates to replace Mary Mullarkey on the Colorado Supreme Court. On September 8, 2010, Democratic Governor Bill Ritter announced Márquez as his choice to replace Mullarkey. The appointment won praise from her former boss, Republican Colorado Attorney General John Suthers.

Márquez is the first Latina and first openly gay person to serve on the Colorado Supreme Court. Her long-term partner is Sheila Barthel. As of 2021, she is the longest-serving of eleven openly LGBT state supreme court justices serving in the United States.

See also 
 List of LGBT jurists in the United States
 List of LGBT state supreme court justices in the United States

References

1969 births
Living people
Justices of the Colorado Supreme Court
Hispanic and Latino American judges
LGBT Hispanic and Latino American people
LGBT judges
LGBT lawyers
LGBT people from Texas
LGBT people from Colorado
People from Grand Junction, Colorado
Stanford University alumni
Yale Law School alumni
21st-century American judges
LGBT appointed officials in the United States
21st-century American women judges